Banksia ornata, commonly known as desert banksia, is a species of shrub that is endemic to south-eastern continental Australia. The Ngarrindjeri people of the Lower Murray region in South Australia know it as yelakut. It has thin bark, serrated, narrow egg-shaped leaves with the lower end towards the base,  cream-coloured flowers in a cylindrical spike, and later, up to fifty follicles in each spike, surrounded by the remains of the flowers.

Description
Banksia ornata is a shrub that typically grows to a height of about  but does not form a lignotuber. It has thin grey bark and stems that are hairy at first, later glabrous. There are hairy involucral bracts at the base of the spike but they fall off before the flowers open.

Taxonomy and naming
Banksia ornata was first formally described in 1854 by Carl Meissner from an unpublished description by Ferdinand von Mueller. The description was published in  Linnaea: ein Journal für die Botanik in ihrem ganzen Umfange, oder Beiträge zur Pflanzenkunde. The specific epithet (ornata) is from the Latin word ornatus meaning "decorated", referring to the flowers and leaves.

Distribution and habitat
Desert banksia is common in western Victoria and in South Australia. In South Australia it is found in the south-east of the state south of Nuriootpa, including on the lower Eyre Peninsula, Kangaroo Island and east of Adelaide. It is confined to the far west of Victoria, mainly between Murrayville and the Grampians. It tends to grow in mallee and heathland environments in sandy, well-drained soils.

Ecology
Nectarivorous birds are attracted to this shrub. Species observed feeding at its flowers include Anthochaera carunculata (red wattlebird), Melithreptus brevirostris (brown-header honeyeater), Melithreptus lunatus (white-naped honeyeater) and Zosterops lateralis (silvereye).

References

ornata
Flora of South Australia
Flora of Victoria (Australia)
Plants described in 1854
Taxa named by Carl Meissner